Falsosophronica fuscobrunnea is a species of beetle in the family Cerambycidae, and the only species in the genus Falsosophronica. It was described by Stephan von Breuning in 1952.

References

Protonarthrini
Beetles described in 1952